George Braden (November 4, 1949 – May 25, 2015) was a Canadian politician from the Northwest Territories, Canada. Elected as "Government Leader", Braden would retroactively become the second premier of the Northwest Territories, after a motion was passed in 1994 to change the official title.

Political career
Prior to seeking election as member of the Legislative Assembly of the Northwest Territories, Braden worked extensively with Charles "Bud" Drury, a former federal cabinet minister, who was assigned to look at further constitutional development in the Northwest Territories.

Appointed to the position of Deputy Minister for the Northwest Territories, Braden worked from Ottawa, Ontario with Walter Slipchenko (Inter-governmental Policy Analyst). Braden was first elected to the NWT Legislative Assembly in 1979. At that time the Commissioner of the Northwest Territories, appointed by the Government of Canada, was also the head of the Government of the NWT. In 1980, for the first time, the Legislative Assembly elected the Government Leader, selecting Braden, who served until 1984. Braden was the second person to hold the title as Frederick Haultain had been appointed to the position in 1897.

Some of the changes implemented by Braden allowed for additional representation in the legislative council, the removal of the appointed commissioner and deputy commissioner from the executive council and for the allowance of control of territorial affairs to elected members.

In 2009, Braden accepted the position of Policy Analyst for Dennis Patterson, who was, earlier the same year, appointed to the Canadian Senate for Nunavut.

Personal life
Braden was the owner and CEO of his own company in Ottawa, Ontario from 1994. Having met in 1989, Braden married Lise Beaudry in August 1998.  As of 2009 they lived in Barrhaven, Ontario. He was diagnosed with gastric cancer on 7 March 2015, at the age of 65 years.  He died at home with Lise on 25 May 2015.

References

External links
Legislative Assembly of Northwest Territories list of premiers

Members of the Legislative Assembly of the Northwest Territories
Premiers of the Northwest Territories
People from Yellowknife
People from Rosthern, Saskatchewan
1949 births
2015 deaths